Falsimargarita thielei is a species of sea snail, a marine gastropod mollusk in the family Calliostomatidae.

Description
The size of the shell varies between 8 mm and 22 mm.

Distribution
This marine species occurs off the South Shetland Islands and the South Orkney Islands at depths between 300 m and 400 m.

References

 Hedley, C. 1916. Mollusca. Australasian Antarctic Expedition, 1911-1914. Scientific Reports (C)4: 80 pp., 9 pls.
 Dell, R. K. (1990). Antarctic Mollusca with special reference to the fauna of the Ross Sea. Bulletin of the Royal Society of New Zealand, Wellington 27: 1–311 page(s): 93 
 Engl W. (2012) Shells of Antarctica. Hackenheim: Conchbooks. 402 pp

External links
 

thielei
Gastropods described in 1916
Fauna of the Southern Ocean